The Japan Football Association (JFA) is the governing body responsible for the administration of football, futsal, beach soccer and efootball in Japan. It is responsible for the national team, as well as club competitions.

History
The association generally translates its name to "Japan Football Association" in English, though "Japan Soccer Association" is also used.

National teams

List of international matches
Annual schedule of Japan national teams in 2023

Men's

Women's

Competitions

Only includes tournaments organized by the JFA.

International competitions

Senior

Youth

Domestic competitions

Senior

Youth

Over-age

League system

Japanese clubs' placements at each league may determine the JFA-organized competition the club will participate in, or if they will be qualified to one at all.

Men's

As of the 2023 season, all clubs in the top two tiers (J1 and J2) enter the Emperor's Cup directly, with the clubs below it having to qualify to the tournament through prefectural tournaments.

Last updated: 10 December 2022

Women's

As of 2022–23 season, all clubs in the top two tiers enter the Empress's Cup directly, with the clubs below having to qualify through regional tournaments. The top tier clubs also qualify to the WE League Cup.

Last updated: 15 October 2022

Branding

The symbol of the JFA is the Yatagarasu, a mythical three-legged raven that guided Emperor Jimmu to Mount Kumano. Yatagarasu is also the messenger of the supreme Shinto sun goddess Amaterasu.

In 1994, the JFA asked Ryuichi Sakamoto to compose the instrumental song - "Japanese Soccer Anthem". There is an arrangement version by Yasuhide Ito. This anthem is played at the beginning of JFA-sponsored events, such as the Emperor's Cup matches and as a prelude to kickoff at stadiums.

Presidents
The following is a list of presidents of Japan Football Association (JFA). The Honorary President is Her Imperial Highness Princess Takamado.

Last updated: 6 March 2022

Management
JFA Academy Fukushima
JFA Academy Sakai
JFA Academy Imabari
JFA Academy Kumamoto Uki

Sponsorship
Last updated: 30 June 2022

See also
Sport in Japan
Football in Japan
Football in Tokyo
Football in Osaka
Women's football in Japan

References

External links
Official website 
JFA on FIFA
JFA on AFC

Football Association
Japan
Association
Sports organizations established in 1921
1921 establishments in Japan
Japan Football Association
Organizations based in Tokyo